Wynter (Wynter Gordon) is an American singer.

Wynter may also refer to:

People
Angela Wynter, British actress
Andrew Wynter, English physician
Bryan Wynter, British painter
Curtis Wynter, English football player
Dana Wynter, American actress
Danny Lee Wynter, British actor
Ed Wynter, Australian rugby league footballer
Henry Wynter, Australian general
Iona Wynter, Jamaican athlete
Mark Wynter, English singer-actor
Paul Wynter, West Indian bodybuilder
Ray Wynter, West Indian cricketer
Sarah Wynter, Australian actress
Sylvia Wynter, Jamaican writer
Thomas Wynter, English priest and supposed son of Thomas Wolsey

Other
Wynter, a Marvel Comics character who is part of Gene Nation

See also 
Winter (disambiguation)